Verica was a British client king of the Roman Empire.

Verica may also refer to:

Given name
 Verica Nedeljković (born 1929), Serbian chess player
 Verica Rakočević (born 1948), Serbian clothing designer
 Verica Kalanović (born 1954), Serbian politician
 Verica Trstenjak (born 1962), Slovenian lawyer and judge
 Verica Šerifović (born 1963), Serbian singer
 Verica Bakoc (born 1999), Canadian water polo player

Surname
Marc Verica (born 1988), American footballer
Tom Verica (born 1964), American actor and television director